Xenarchus carmen is a moth of the Aididae family. It is found in Brazil and the Guianas.

References

Moths described in 1892
Zygaenoidea